Rabah Bitat (ALA-LC: Rābaḥ Bīṭāṭ; 19 December 1925 in Aïn Kerma – 10 April 2000) was an Algerian Nationalist and politician.

He served as interim President of Algeria from 1978 to 1979, after Houari Boumediene's death.

Career

Bitat was appointed as Vice President of Algeria in the cabinet of Ahmed Ben Bella from September 1962 to September 1963. Bitat served as President of the People's National Assembly from April 1977 to October 1990 and was the interim President of Algeria from 27 December 1978 to 9 February 1979. He became president after the death of Houari Boumédiènne and was replaced by Chadli Bendjedid. He was from the Front de Libération National.

Bitat first supported, then opposed, Ahmed Ben Bella. He held the transportation portfolio under Houari Boumédienne before becoming the first president of the ANP (by the constitution of 1976). Bitat served as acting president (December 1978 – February 1979) after Boumédienne's death in December 1978.

Death
Bitat died in Paris on 10 April 2000.

Personal life
He is survived by his wife Zohra Drif, a member of the Council of the Nation. Bitat and Drif went on to have three children, and now have five grandchildren. They were married until his death in 2000.

See also
 Declaration of 1 November 1954

References

1925 births
2000 deaths
People from Constantine, Algeria
Movement for the Triumph of Democratic Liberties politicians
National Liberation Front (Algeria) politicians
Members of the National Liberation Front (Algeria)
Presidents of the People's National Assembly of Algeria
Vice presidents of Algeria
Algerian revolutionaries